The mission of the 131st Operations Group, 131st Bomb Wing, is to provide expeditionary, B-2 global strike combat support capabilities to geographic commanders and Commander, United States Strategic Command. This is done by training and equipping airmen to fly the aircraft of the 509th Bomb Wing. The group also organizes, trains, and prepares a force of citizen airmen to defend and serve the people of Missouri.

Units
 110th Bomb Squadron
 110th Operations Support Flight

History

World War II

During World War II, the 131st Operations Group's heraldic predecessor, the 364th Fighter Group, organized and trained in California during 1943 before moving to England in January 1944 where it was assigned to VIII Fighter Command.  The 364th flew escort, dive-bombing, strafing, and patrol missions in France, Belgium, the Netherlands, and Germany.  At first the group operated primarily as escort for Boeing B-17 Flying Fortress and Consolidated B-24 Liberator heavy bombers.  The group patrolled the English Channel during the Normandy invasion in June 1944, and while continuing escort operations, supported ground forces in France after the invasion by strafing and bombing locomotives, marshalling yards, bridges, barges, and other targets.

In the summer of 1944, the 364th converted from Lockheed P-38 Lightnings to North American P-51 Mustangs and until the end of the war flew many long-range missions including escorting heavy bombers to attack oil refineries, industries, and other strategic objectives at Berlin, Regensburg, Merseburg, Stuttgart, Brussels, and elsewhere.  The 364th received a Distinguished Unit Citation for an escort mission on 27 December 1944 when the group dispersed a large force of German fighters that attacked the bomber formation the group was escorting on a raid to Frankfurt.

The 364th also flew air-sea rescue missions, engaged in patrol activities, and continued to support ground forces as the battle line advanced through France and into Germany. It took part in Operation Market-Garden, the effort secure bridgeheads across the Rhine in the Netherlands by air, September 1944; the Battle of the Bulge, December 1944 – January 1945; and Operation Varsity, the airborne assault across the Rhine in March 1945.  Although the last mission by the 364th took place on 25 April 1945, the group did not depart until November, returning to Camp Kilmer New Jersey for inactivation

Missouri Air National Guard
The wartime 364th Fighter Group was allotted to the National Guard as the 131st Fighter Group on 24 May 1946.  It was organized at Lambert Field, near St Louis, Missouri and was extended federal recognition on 15 July 1946.  Assigned to the Missouri National Guard's 57th Fighter Wing, the 131st Group controlled the 110th Fighter Squadron in St. Louis and the 180th Bombardment Squadron at Rosecrans Memorial Airport, St Joseph. On 1 November 1950 the 71st Fighter Wing was inactivated and its personnel and equipment were assigned to the new 131st Composite Wing when Continental Air Command reorganized its combat units under the Wing Base organization. The 131st Wing has been the group's parent ever since.

Korean War activation

On 1 March 1951 the 131st was federalized and brought to active duty due to the Korean War.   It initially transferred to Bergstrom Air Force Base, Texas as the 131st Fighter-Bomber Group was composed of the 110th Fighter Squadron, the 170th Fighter-Bomber Squadron (Illinois ANG) and the 192d Fighter-Bomber Squadron (Nevada ANG).

In November when the group was transferred to Tactical Air Command (TAC) and moved to George Air Force Base, California.  At George, the unit trained for deployment overseas.  On 1 December 1952, its period of federal service terminated and the group was relieved from active duty and returned to the Missouri Air National Guard, while its personnel and equipment at George were transferred to the 479th Fighter-Bomber Group.

Tactical Air Command

Returning to Lambert Field, the 131st became a light bombardment group and came under TAC for mobilization.   It received Douglas B-26 Invaders that returned from the Korean War and trained primarily in night bombardment missions.  With the retirement of the B-26 in 1957, the 131st entered the "Jet Age."  It received its first jet aircraft in the spring of 1957 when it received some Lockheed F-80 Shooting Stars, then in June 1957, with a mission of air defense.  The group was inactivated in November 1958.

After the 131st Wing returned to St. Louis after mobilization for the Berlin Crisis of 1961, the group was reactivated as the 131st Tactical Fighter Group and equipped with North American F-100C Super Sabres in late 1962.  Although not activated during the Vietnam War, many of the group's pilots were sent to F-100 squadrons in South Vietnam between 1968 and 1971.  The group was again inactivated in 1974, when Air National Guard tactical groups on the same base as their parent wings were discontinued and their squadrons assigned directly to the wing.

Air Combat Command

The Air Force again reorganized under the Objective Wing model and in 1993, the group again activated as the 131st Operations Group.  Members were called into service to battle the Great Flood of 1993.  In the post-Cold War era, the unit deployed to Incirlik Air Base, Turkey in support of Operation Northern Watch in 1996, 1997 and 1998.

On 16 March 2006, the Air Force announced that elements of the group would become an associate unit of the active duty 509th Bomb Wing at Whiteman Air Force Base.  Consequently, the group transitioned from flying and maintaining the F-15C Eagle fighter to the Northrop Grumman B-2 Spirit bomber.  The final flight of the F-15C Eagle by the 131st occurred in June 2009.   The 509th and the 131st joined forces according to what is known as a "classic associate wing" structure.  As a result, active duty and Air National Guard pilots and maintainers fly B-2 missions and sustain the aircraft as though they were one unit.

Global Strike Command

The 131st Bomb Wing's transition to Air Force Global Strike Command occurred on 4 October 2008 when the 131st Bomb Wing held a ribbon-cutting ceremony at Whiteman.  The ceremony celebrated the first official drill for traditional guardsmen at Whiteman and the grand opening of building 3006, the 131st Bomb Wing's first headquarters there.  On 16 June 2009, the last F-15 departed Lambert Field.  In August 2013, the 131st Bomb Wing was deemed fully mission-capable, meaning that it fully completed the transition to Whiteman Air Force Base.

Lineage
 Constituted as the 364th Fighter Group on 25 May 1943
 Activated on 1 June 1943
 Inactivated on 10 November 1945
 Redesignated 131st Fighter Group and allotted to the Air National Guard on 24 May 1946
 Federal recognition on 15 July 1946
 Redesignated 131st Composite Group on 1 November 1950
 Redesignated: 131st Fighter Group on 1 February 1951
 Called to active duty on 1 March 1951
 Redesignated 131st Fighter-Bomber Group on 9 April 1951
 Inactivated and returned to Missouri state control, 1 December 1952
 Redesignated 131st Bombardment Group, Light on 1 December 1952
 Redesignated 131st Bombardment Group, Tactical in 1955
 Redesignated 131st Fighter-Interceptor Group on 15 June 1957
 Inactivated 1 November 1958
 Redesignated 131st Tactical Fighter Group
 Activated 1 August 1962
 Inactivated 30 September 1974
 Redesignated 131st Operations Group
 Activated 1 January 1993

Assignments
 IV Fighter Command, 1 June 1943 – 11 January 1944
 67th Fighter Wing, 10 February 1944 (attached to: 1st Bombardment Division (later 1st Air Division), 15 September 1943 – 3 November 1945
 Army Service Forces, 9–10 November 1945
 66th Fighter Wing, 15 July 1946
 71st Fighter Wing, 1 January 1947
 131st Composite Wing (later 131st Fighter Wing, 131st Fighter-Bomber Wing), 1 November 1951 – 1 December 1952
 131st Bombardment Wing (later 131st Fighter-Interceptor Wing), 1 December 1952 – 1 November 1958
 131st Tactical Fighter Wing, 1 October 1962 – 30 September 1974
 131st Fighter Wing (later 131st Bomb Wing), 1 January 1993 – present

Components
 110th Fighter Squadron (later 110th Fighter-Bomber Squadron, 110th Tactical Fighter Squadron, 110th Fighter Squadron, 110th Bomb Squadron), 23 September 1946 – 1 November 1952, 1 November 1952 – 1 November 1958, 1 October 1962 – 30 September 1974, 1 January 1993 – present
 122d Bombardment Squadron, 1 January 1953 – 15 June 1957
 New Orleans Lakefront Airport
 169th Tactical Fighter Squadron, 1 August 1962 – 15 October 1962
 Greater Peoria Airport
 170th Fighter-Bomber Squadron (later 170th Tactical Fighter Squadron), 1 February 1951 – 1 December 1952, 1 August 1962 – 15 October 1962
 180th Bombardment Squadron,  1 November 1950 – 1 February 1951; 1 January 1953 – 10 April 1958
 Rosecrans Memorial Airport
 192d Fighter-Bomber Squadron, 1 February 1951 – 1 September 1952
 383d Fighter Squadron: 1 June 1943 – 10 November 1945
 384th Fighter Squadron: 1 June 1943 – 10 November 1945
 385th Fighter Squadron: 1 June 1943 – 10 November 1945

Stations

 Glendale Airport, California, 1 June 1943
 Van Nuys Airport, California, 12 August 1943
 Ontario Army Airfield, California, 11 October 1943
 Santa Maria Army Air Field, California, c. 7 December 1943 – c. 11 January 1944
 RAF Honington (AAF-375), England, February 1944 – c. November 1945
 Camp Kilmer, New Jersey, 9–10 November 1945
 Lambert Field, Missouri,  15 July 1946
 Bergstrom Air Force Base, Texas, 1 March 1951
 George Air Force Base, California, July 1951 – 1 December 1952
 Lambert Field, Missouri, 1 December 1952 – 1 November 1958
 Robertson Air National Guard Base, Missouri, 1 January 1993
 Whiteman Air Force Base, Missouri, 4 Oct 2008 – present

Aircraft

 Lockheed P-38J Lightning. 1943–1944
 North American P-51D (later F-51D) Mustang, 1944–1945, 1946–1952
 North American P-51K Mustang, 1944–1945
 Douglas B-26 Invader, 1946–1957
 Lockheed F-80 Shooting Star, 1957
 Republic F-84 Thunderjet, 1957–1958
 Republic F-84F Thunderstreak, 1957–1958
 North American F-100C Super Sabre, 1962–1971
 North American F-100D Super Sabre, 1971–1974
 North American F-100F Super Sabre, 1962–1974
 McDonnell Douglas F-15A Eagle, 1993–2004
 McDonnell Douglas F-15B Eagle, 1993–2004
 McDonnell Douglas F-15C Eagle, 2004–2009
 McDonnell Douglas F-15D Eagle, 2004–2009
 Northrop Grumman B-2 Spirit, 2009–present

References

Notes
 Explanatory notes

 Citations

Bibliography

 
 

United States Strategic Command